Enters the Colossus is the debut EP by American hip hop artist Mr. Lif. It was released November 14, 2000, on the Def Jux record label.

Track listing
"DataBlend" – 3:20
Produced by Mr. Lif
"Cro-Magnon" – 3:56
Featuring Illin P
Produced by DJ Fakts One
"Pulse Cannon" – 3:00
Featuring Insight and T-Ruckus
Produced by Insight
"Enters the Colossus" – 3:08
Produced by Mr. Lif
Contains a sample from "Lyrics to Go, by A Tribe Called Quest
"Avengers" – 2:56
Featuring Akrobatik
Produced by DJ Fakts One
"Front on This" – 3:57
Produced by DJ paWL
"Arise" – 10:45
Produced by El-P
Includes bonus track "Retrospect", produced by DJ Fakts One

References

External links
 Mr. Lif official website
 Definitive Jux official website
 

2000 debut EPs
Mr. Lif albums
Definitive Jux EPs
Albums produced by El-P